Italia Valley is a small valley lying east-northeast of Hervé Cove in Ezcurra Inlet, on King George Island in the South Shetland Islands. The feature was named "Conca Italia" (Italian hollow) and used as the site of its Base Giacomo Bove by the first private Italian expedition to Antarctica, 1975–76, led by Rennato Cepparo. The name has been approved with an English generic term.

References

Valleys of Antarctica
Landforms of King George Island (South Shetland Islands)
Landforms of the South Shetland Islands